Jean Luc Ponpon is an international songwriting and production team consisting of members Daniel Merlot, Takanori Tsunoda, Stefan Breadley.

Daniel Merlot (also known as Crash Berlin) is the Music director/keyboardist for Porcelain Black (Universal Records ) produced by Red One -Lady Gaga's producer and has recently been on U.S./Canada 25 city tour with Lil Wayne & Nicki Minaj . He also produces artists internationally and across Asia, and is the Music Director for Tokyo Girls Collection in China With a long career as DJ / music producer / musician has seen Daniel deejaying with Justice, Bjork, Peaches, Janes Addiction, Kool Keith, and others.

Stefan Breadley started as an in-house audio engineer for 4th Street Recording Studios in 1998 by installing their Pro Tools system. Since then, he has expanded to production and mixing, and has been fortunate enough to work with many of 4th Street's top clients, including artists from Incubus, Prodigy, Seven Dust, Korn, Black Eyed Peas and many more. A vocal specialist, Stefan has extensive experience recording, arranging, editing and mixing vocals. Always keen to try new things, Stefan volunteered for the odd jobs, and over the years has worked with every type of media, and produced every type of music.

Daniel Merlot banded Jean Luc ponpon in 2008.

Production Credits

Porcelain Black featuring Lil Wayne
 11. “This Is What Rock n' Roll Looks Like“

Perry Farrell(Lollapalooza / Jane’s Addiction)
 11. “KING Z“

SPICA
 14. “I Did it“

Shang Wenjie
 11. “IN“ 
 12. “Ode To The Doom“ 
 13. “back to the world“

Morning Musume
 16. "Mukidashi de Mukiatte“
 17. "Brand New Morning"

℃-ute
 15. The Middle Management“
 15. "Digitalic→0 (LOVE)“

VOGUE - Video
 08. “Fashion on demand:rock baby“

References

External links
DANIEL MERLOT
TAKANORI TSUNODA
STEFAN BROADLEY

Record production teams